The Wassmer WA-40 Super 4 Sancy is a French single-engined light aircraft of the 1960s and 70s. A single-engined low-winged monoplane with retractable nosewheel undercarriage, variants include the more powerful WA 4/21 Prestige and the WA-41 Baladou with a fixed undercarriage.

Design and development
In 1955, Société Wassmer, which was formed in 1905 as an aircraft repair organisation, opened a design department, subsequently building over 300 Jodel aircraft under license before producing its first fully original aircraft, the WA-40 Super Sancy. This was a low-winged monoplane with a retractable nosewheel undercarriage. The fuselage was of steel tube construction with fabric covering, while the wings were of wooden construction. The first prototype flew on 8 June 1959, receiving French certification on 9 June 1960.

On the 53rd production aircraft (1963), a swept vertical fin and rudder were incorporated (designated WA.40A; first flying in January 1963 and receiving French certification in March 1963); all subsequent units produced continued the swept design.

In 1965 the WA.41, with fixed landing gear was introduced, named Baladou. In March 1967 the Super 4/21 Prestige, powered by a 235 hp (175 kW) Lycoming O-540 engine. The 4/21 used a McCauley variable-pitch propeller, autopilot, electric flaps and IFR instrumentation.

An all-metal derivative design, the CE-43 Guépard (Cheetah) was produced by CERVA, a production company which Wassmer and Siren SA formed. It used the same engine as the Prestige (which by 1971 had been upgraded to a 250 hp Lycoming IO-540).

Wassmer suffered financial difficulty in 1977, and became insolvent in September 1977. By that time the Guépard offered an optional sixth seat, and designers were developing two further variants, the CE.44 Cougar and the CE.45 Léopard. However, due to the liquidation, those developments were not finalized, and no further aircraft were produced after September 1977.

Variants
WA-40 Super IV
Original production. Powered by 180 hp Lycoming O-360-A1A engine. Upswept fin. Two prototypes + 50 production aircraft.
WA-40A Super IV
Revised production with swept fin. 180 WA-40 and WA40A built.
WA-41 Baladou
Simplified version with fixed undercarriage. 60 built by 1970.
WA 4/21 Prestige
More powerful version of the WA-40A with 250 hp Lycoming IO-540-C4B5 engine, electric flaps and landing gear, lengthened nose, the prototype was fitted with a 235 hp engine, 25 built by 1970.
WA-41-250
Alternate designation for the WA 4/21 production aircraft with a 250 hp engine.
CERVA CE-43 'Guépard'
derived from the WA4/21 the CE-43 was produced by CERVA
CERVA CE-44 'Couguar'
derived from CE-43 'Guépard'
CERVA CE-45 'Leopard'
derived from CE-43 'Guépard'

Specifications (WA-40A)

References

Sources
 

Wassmer aircraft
1950s French civil utility aircraft
Single-engined tractor aircraft
Low-wing aircraft
Aircraft first flown in 1959